Sung-Mo “Steve” Kang is an electrical engineering scientist, professor, author, inventor, entrepreneur and 15th president of KAIST. Kang was appointed as the second chancellor of the University of California, Merced in 2007. He was the first department head of foreign origin at the electrical and computer engineering department at the University of Illinois at Urbana-Champaign. Dr. Kang teaches and has written extensively in the field of computer-aided design for electronic circuits and systems; he is recognized and respected worldwide for his outstanding research contributions. Dr. Kang has led the development of the world’s first 32-bit microprocessor chips as a technical supervisor at AT&T Bell Laboratories and designed satellite-based private communication networks as a member of technical staff. Dr. Kang holds 15 U.S. patents and has won numerous awards for his  ground breaking achievements in the field of electrical engineering.

He was president of the IEEE Circuits and Systems Society, founding editor-in-chief of the IEEE Transactions on VLSI Systems, and an IEEE distinguished lecturer. He was also president of the Silicon Valley Engineering Council and continues to serve on advisory committees for projects in the U.S. and internationally. Also as an entrepreneur, he co-founded a fabless mobile memory chip design company named ZTI, originally in Sunnyvale, now in San Jose.

Biography

Background and education
Sung-Mo “Steve” Kang was born and raised in Seoul, Korea. Kang is the first in his family to attend college. Kang’s grandfather, who have fought for Korean independence and experienced Japanese occupation, helped him to immigrate to the U.S. and study electrical engineering to become a college professor. As a distinguished scholar and a leader in engineering education, Kang has gone beyond this dream.

Kang received his B.S. from Fairleigh Dickinson University in 1970, his M.S. from State University of New York at Buffalo in 1972 and his Ph.D. from University of California at Berkeley in 1975. All his academic degrees are in electrical engineering.

Career
After his graduation, he has taught at various universities in the U.S., Germany and Switzerland, and worked as a technician and supervisor at AT&T Bell Laboratories in New Jersey. He was a visiting professor at the École Polytechnique Fédérale de Lausanne, the University of Karlsruhe and the Technical University of Munich, and a chaired visiting professor of Electrical Engineering and Computer Science of Korea Advanced Institute of Science and Technology (KAIST). He has also taught at Rutgers University.

Dr. Kang joined the University of Illinois at Urbana-Champaign as an associate professor electrical and computer engineering in 1985, and was promoted to professor in 1990. From 1995 to 2000, Dr. Kang served as the head of the electrical and computer engineering department at the University of Illinois at Urbana-Champaign; he was the first department head of foreign origin in 110 years. He was honored as the first Charles Marshall Senior University Scholar and directed several research organizations.

From 2001 to 2007, Kang served as dean of the Baskin School of Engineering at UC Santa Cruz. During this time, Kang brought the Baskin School from infancy to its current standing as a well-regarded graduate school of engineering. Since taking the position in 2001, he doubled the size of the faculty, recruiting the highest caliber professors and researchers to the growing school. Federal research funding increased four-fold during Kang’s tenure, from $5 million to $20 million, and the school’s scholarship fund has grown by tenfold. In his six years as dean of engineering, he took a nascent program to significantly higher levels of achievement during its second phase of development.

In 2007, Dr. Kang became the second chancellor of the University of California, Merced; he also teaches at the school of engineering as a professor.

Dr. Kang was the president of KAIST from 2013 to 2017.

Other activities and leadership
While at UC Santa Cruz, Kang chaired the UC Santa Cruz Chancellor’s Education Partnership Advisory Committee. He also served on advisory committees for the National Youth Leadership Forum and the Silicon Valley Engineering, Manufacturing and Technology Alliance.

Kang has forged important partnerships with the California Institute for Quantitative Biosciences (QB3), the California Institute for Information Technology Research in the Interest of Society (CITRIS), and NASA's University Affiliated Research Center.

He attracted a $2 million National Science Foundation program for Developing Effective Engineering Pathways (DEEP) for community college students in the Silicon Valley region. He has also served on the advisory boards for UC’s COSMOS and MESA programs.

Kang initiated and established several international programs at UC, including executive programs for managers from Korea and exchange programs with the Swiss Federal Institute of Technology at Lausanne (EPFL), Hokkaido Information University, KAIST, Yonsei University, Konkuk University, Seoul National University, POSTECH, and the Catholic University of Daegu.

Membership
He serves on the UC Merced Foundation as president, the Great Valley Center as chairman of the board, and the Central Valley Higher Education Consortium as an executive board member. Kang is a Foreign Member of the National Academy of Engineering of Korea, a fellow of IEEE, ACM, AAAS, and is listed in Who's Who in America, Who's Who in Technology, Who's Who in Engineering and Who's Who in Midwest.

Awards
 1996 IEEE Technical Field Award for Graduate Teaching
 1997 Alexander von Humboldt Award for Senior US Scientists
 2000 IEEE Third Millennium Medal
 2001 Outstanding Alumnus Award in Electrical Engineering, UC Berkeley
 2003 Chancellor's Stellar Service Award
 2005 IEEE Mac Van Valkenburg Award
 2007 Gandhi, King, Ikeda Community Builder Award from Morehouse College
 2007 Chang-Lin Tien Education Leadership Award
 2008 Distinguished Yonsei Alumnus Award
 2008 ISQED Quality Award (Please see the International Society for Quality Electronic Design)
 2008 The Korean-American Leadership Award
 2009 The Silicon Valley Engineering Hall of Fame

Publications
Dr. Kang has written or co-authored nine books and more than 350 technical papers in the field of electrical engineering.

Books
 Design Automation for Timing-Driven Layout Synthesis, Kluwer Academic Publishers, 1993
 Hot-Carrier Reliability of MOS VLSI Circuits, Kluwer Academic Publishers, 1993
 Physical Design for Multichip Modules, Kluwer Academic Publishers, 1994
 Modeling of Electrical Overstress in Integrated Circuits, Kluwer Academic Publishers, 1994
 CMOS Digital Integrated Circuits: Analysis and Design, McGraw-Hill, 1995
 Computer-Aided Design of Optoelectronic Integrated Circuits and Systems, Prentice-Hall, 1996
 CMOS Digital Integrated Circuits: Analysis and Design, McGraw-Hill, Second Ed., 1999
 Electrothermal Analysis of VLSI Systems, Kluwer Academics, June 2000
 CMOS Digital Integrated Circuits: Analysis and Design, McGraw-Hill, Third Ed., 2002

References

External links
UC Merced Chancellor website

American electrical engineers
Fairleigh Dickinson University alumni
Chancellors of campuses of the University of California
University of California, Merced faculty
UC Berkeley College of Engineering alumni
Rutgers University faculty
American academics of Korean descent
Living people
Engineers from California
Year of birth missing (living people)
Presidents of KAIST